Ericodesma antilecta is a species of moth of the family Tortricidae. It is found in Australia, where it has been recorded from Tasmania.

The wingspan is about 16.5 mm.

References

Moths described in 1939
Archipini